The Lady from Texas is a 1951 American Comedy Western film directed by Joseph Pevney and starring Howard Duff, Mona Freeman and Josephine Hull.

Plot
A ranch cook and a cowboy save a poor old Civil War widow from a land grabber in the Old West.

Cast
 Howard Duff as Dan Mason
 Mona Freeman as Bonnie Lee
 Josephine Hull as Miss Birdie Wheeler
 Gene Lockhart as Judge George Jeffers
 Craig Stevens as Cyril Guthrie
 Jay C. Flippen as Sheriff Mike McShane
 Ed Begley as Dave Blodgett
 Morgan Farley as Lucian Haddon
 Chris-Pin Martin as José 
 Barbara Knudson as Mabel Guthrie 
 Kenneth Patterson as Craig Toland
 John Maxwell as Mr. Deevers

See also
 List of American films of 1951

References

External links
 
 
 

1951 films
1951 comedy films
1950s Western (genre) comedy films
American Western (genre) comedy films
Films directed by Joseph Pevney
Universal Pictures films
1950s English-language films
1950s American films